Missamma is a 1955 Telugu film.

Missamma may also refer to:

 Missamma (soundtrack), a soundtrack album from the 1955 film
 Missamma (2003 film), a Telugu film\

See also 

 Maisamma, a Hindu folk goddess
 Maisamma IPS, a 2008 Indian Telugu film
 Missiamma, a 1955 Tamil film